San Martín is a department in the east of San Juan province (Argentina). It is predominantly a landscape of mountains in the east and significant production wine, with the installation of prestigious wineries with a remarkable track record in the province known nationally by the development of wine table and fine wine.

In 1996, it became the second controlled appellation established in Mendoza alongside the renowned Luján de Cuyo.

Departments of San Juan Province, Argentina
Wine regions of Argentina